Shangoda is a rural locality (a selo) and the administrative centre of Shangodinsky Selsoviet, Gunibsky District, Republic of Dagestan, Russia. The population was 517 as of 2010. There are 2 streets.

Geography 
Shangoda is located 28 km southeast of Gunib (the district's administrative centre) by road, on the Kunekh River. Shitli and Bukhty are the nearest rural localities.

Nationalities 
Avars live there.

References 

Rural localities in Gunibsky District